Banda University of Agriculture and Technology (BUAT), is an agricultural university at Banda in the Indian state of Uttar Pradesh.

References

External links
 Official website

Agricultural universities and colleges in Uttar Pradesh
Banda, Uttar Pradesh
Educational institutions established in 2010
2010 establishments in Uttar Pradesh
Universities and colleges in Banda district, India